Hippaliosinidae is a family of bryozoans belonging to the order Cheilostomatida.

Genera:
 Gemelliporidra Canu & Bassler, 1927
 Hippaliosina Canu, 1919

References

Cheilostomatida